Augustus Seymour Porter (January 18, 1798September 18, 1872) was a U.S. statesman from the state of Michigan.

Early life
He was born in Canandaigua, New York, the son of Augustus Porter (1769–1849) and his first wife, Lavinia Steele. His brothers were Albert Howell Porter (1801-1888) and Peter Buell Porter, Jr. (1806–1871), and his uncle was Peter Buell Porter (1773–1844), the United States Secretary of War under John Quincy Adams.

He attended Canandaigua Academy, and graduated from Union College, in Schenectady, New York, in 1818, studied law and was admitted to the bar and commenced practice in Detroit, Michigan.

Career
Porter became the recorder of Detroit in 1830 and was the treasurer of the Michigan Pioneer Society in 1837. He was elected mayor of Detroit in 1838, resigning in 1839 to run for the United States Senate, and was succeeded as mayor by Asher B. Bates on March 14, 1839.

He was elected as a Whig to the United States Senate, and served from January 20, 1840, until March 3, 1845. He did not run for reelection in 1844. He was chairman of the Committee on Roads and Canals, 1841–1845, and was on the Committee on Enrolled Bills, 1841–1843.

Personal life
On July 25, 1822, he married Sarah A. Mansfield (d. 1824). Mansfield died a few months after the birth of Porter's only son:

 Samuel M. Porter (b. 1824), who died in youth.

On September 24, 1832, he married his second wife, Sarah G. Barnard (1807–1885), his cousin and the daughter of Robert Foster Barnard (1784–1850) and Augusta Porter (1786–1833).  Sarah was the sister of Frederick Augustus Porter Barnard (1809–1889), a Columbia University President, and Gen. John G. Barnard (1815–1882). She was also a niece of Senator Henry Clay (1777–1852). Together, they had:

 Jane A. Porter (b. 1833)
 Sarah Frederica Porter (b. 1836), who married Stephen E. Burrall (1826–1868), in 1863, and who lived in London in 1885.

In 1848, he moved to his father's residence, in Niagara Falls, New York, and died there on September 18, 1872. He is interred in Oakwood Cemetery in Niagara Falls, New York. Sarah died at Newport, Isle of Wight on April 30, 1885.

Descendants
Through his youngest daughter, he was the grandfather of Guy Augustus Porter–Burrall (1865–1890), a Cambridge University lawyer and Lieutenant in the British Army, and Stephen E. Porter–Burrall (1868–1896), an 1883 Eton College graduate. The family assumed the name of Porter–Burrall, by letters patent from Queen Victoria, on August 16, 1886.

References

External links

 

1798 births
1872 deaths
Burials in New York (state)
Mayors of Detroit
United States senators from Michigan
Union College (New York) alumni
Politicians from Canandaigua, New York
Politicians from Niagara Falls, New York
Michigan Whigs
19th-century American politicians
Whig Party United States senators
People from Niagara County, New York